Theodore W. Ruger is an American jurist and academic administrator specializing in constitutional law, judicial authority, health law, and the regulation of therapeutic goods. He is the Bernard G. Segal Professor of Law and dean of the University of Pennsylvania Law School.

Education 
Ruger completed a A.B. at Williams College and a J.D. at Harvard Law School.

Career 
Ruger served as a law clerk for Stephen Breyer and Michael Boudin. Ruger worked in private practice at Ropes & Gray and Williams & Connolly. For three years, he was an associate professor at the Washington University School of Law.

Ruger joined the faculty at the University of Pennsylvania Law School in 2004. He was promoted to deputy dean of the law school in 2013 and dean in 2015, succeeding interim dean Wendell Pritchett.

References

External links

Living people
Year of birth missing (living people)
Place of birth missing (living people)
Williams College alumni
Harvard Law School alumni
Washington University in St. Louis faculty
University of Pennsylvania Law School faculty
American scholars of constitutional law
21st-century American lawyers
American university and college faculty deans
Law clerks of the Supreme Court of the United States